Mining in Ecuador was slow to develop in comparison to other Latin American countries, in spite of large mineral reserves. As late as 2012, according to the United Nations, Ecuador received less foreign direct investment per person than any other country in Latin America. During the 1980s, mining contributed only 0.7 percent to the Ecuadorian economy and employed around 7,000 people. Minerals were located in regions with little to no access, hindering exploration. Ecuador has reserves of gold, silver, copper, zinc, uranium, lead, sulfur, kaolin and limestone. The latter practically dominated the early industry as it was used in local cement plants.

Gold, which was largely forgotten since its early exploitation in the sixteenth century, regained momentum in the 1980s. Ecuador was exporting 2.4 tons per year by 1987, which was mostly discovered in the southern Sierra region, as well as the southeastern province of Zamora-Chinchipe.

In 1985 Ecuador's Congress passed a new law to encourage foreign exploration and investment that simplified regulation and offered higher financial incentives and lower taxation for investors, while also establishing the Ecuadorian Institute of Minerals (Instituto Ecuatoriano de Minería—Inemin) under the Ministry of Energy and Mines.

Mining has contributed to environmental conflict in Ecuador; and Indigenous-led popular uprisings have made demands for Indigenous consultation on mining projects and increased protection for land and water. During 2012, Indigenous leaders organised a two week march to the capital in protests of mining concessions granted to China. In June 2022, protestors halted production at Mirador copper mine by blockading entry roads as part of a larger national uprising that made multiple demands on the Ecuadorian government, including a moratorium on the expansion of mining and oil projects.

Mining Reform under Correa (2007-17) 
Policies during President Rafael Correa's first six years in office slowed mining activity, despite his plans to develop the industry. A mining law passed in 2008 set ambiguous standards for mining contracts, requiring mining companies to negotiate royalty payments with the government. Analysts concluded that the lack of clarity in the legislation would discourage foreign investment. A later mining law passed on 13 June 2013 made Ecuador much more lucrative for foreign investors, imposing an 8% ceiling on the previously open-ended royalties and reducing windfall taxes that had led mining companies to withdraw from the Fruta del Norte gold mine.

Soon after the 2013 law had passed, it was reported that several indigenous groups in opposition of large-scale mining planned to take their cases to the international courts later in the year. Led by Carlos Perez, Ecuador's Confederation of Peoples of Kichwa Nationality (ECUARUNARI) had already filed a domestic lawsuit. Perez said, "Mining activity affects our ancestral territories. We will do everything to defend our land and our people. We will go to the Human Rights Commission and, if necessary, to the Inter-American Court of Human Rights, asking for protective measures." The  Confederation of Indigenous Nationalities of Ecuador (CONAIE) "also filed a suit before the constitutional court asking for a law to carry out prelegislative consultation for people that could be affected by mining." Their president, Humberto Cholango, didn't rule out going to the international courts.

Copper and silver mining

Mirador

San Carlos-Panantza

Gold mining

References

 
Economy of Ecuador
Environment of Ecuador